KOBE (1450 AM) is a radio station broadcasting a Conservative News Talk format. Licensed to Las Cruces, New Mexico, United States, the station opened for operation on October 4, 1947, and serves the Las Cruces area.  The station is currently owned by Bravo Mic Communications, LLC.  Its studios and transmitter are located separately in Las Cruces.

On September 1, 2019 KOBE returned their format to news/talk from Spanish CHR.

References

External links

OBE
OBE (AM)
Contemporary hit radio stations in the United States